A county is a geographic region of a country used for administrative or other purposes in certain modern nations. The term is derived from the Old French   denoting a jurisdiction under the sovereignty of a count (earl) or a viscount.

When the Normans conquered England, they brought the term with them. The Saxons had already established the districts that became the historic counties of England, calling them shires; many county names derive from the name of the county town (county seat) with the word shire added on: for example, Gloucestershire and Worcestershire. The Anglo-Saxon terms earl and earldom were taken as equivalent to the continental terms "count" and "county" under the conquering Normans, and over time the two blended and became equivalent. Further, the later-imported term became a synonym for the native Old English word  or, in Modern English, shire – an equivalent administrative division of the kingdom. The term "county" evolved, consequently, to designate a level of local administration that was immediately beneath a national government, within a unitary (non-federal) system of government. County later also became used differently in some federal systems of government, for a local administrative division subordinate to a primary subnational entity, such as a Province (e.g. Canada) or a level 3 territorial unit (NUTS 3).
 
In the United States and Canada, founded 600 years later on the British traditions, counties are usually an administrative division set by convenient geographical demarcations, which in governance have certain officeholders (for example sheriffs and their departments) as a part of the state and provincial mechanisms, including geographically common court systems.

A county may be further subdivided into districts, hundreds, townships or other administrative jurisdictions within the county. A county usually, but not always, contains cities, towns, townships, villages, or other municipal corporations, which in most cases are somewhat subordinate or dependent upon county governments. Depending on the nation, municipality, and local geography, municipalities may or may not be subject to direct or indirect county control — the functions of both levels are often consolidated into a city government when the area is densely populated.

Outside English-speaking countries, an equivalent of the term county is often used to describe subnational jurisdictions that are structurally equivalent to counties in the relationship they have with their national government; but which may not be administratively equivalent to counties in predominantly English-speaking countries.

Africa

Kenya

Counties are the current second-level political division in Kenya. Each county has an assembly where members of the county assembly (MCAs) sit. This assembly is headed by a governor. Each county is also represented in the Senate of Kenya by a senator. Additionally, a women's representative is elected from each county to the Parliament of Kenya to represent women's interests. Counties replaced provinces as the second-level division after the promulgation of the 2010 Constitution of Kenya.

Liberia

Liberia has 15 counties, each of which elects two senators to the Senate of Liberia.

Asia

China

The English word county is used to translate the Chinese term  ( or ). In Mainland China, governed by the People's Republic of China (PRC), counties and county-level divisions are the third level of regional/local government, coming under the provincial level and the prefectural level, and above the township level and village level.

There are 1,464 so-named "counties" out of 2,862 county-level divisions in the PRC, and the number of counties has remained more or less constant since the Han dynasty (206 BC – AD 220). It remains one of the oldest titles of local-level government in China and significantly predates the establishment of provinces in the Yuan dynasty (1279–1368). The county government was particularly important in imperial China because this was the lowest level at which the imperial government is functionally involved, while below it the local people are managed predominantly by the gentries. The head of a county government during imperial China was the magistrate, who was often a newly ascended jinshi.

In older context, district was an older English translation of  before the establishment of the Republic of China (ROC). The English nomenclature county was adopted following the establishment of the ROC. In addition, provincial cities have the same level of authority as counties. Above county, there are special municipalities (in effect) and province (suspended due to economical and political reasons). There are currently 13 counties in the ROC-controlled territories.

During most of the imperial era, there were no concepts like municipalities in China. All cities existed within counties, commanderies, prefectures, etc., and had no governments of their own. Large cities (must be imperial capitals or seats of prefectures) could be divided and administered by two or three counties. The yamen or governmental houses of these counties exist in the same city. In other words, they share one county town.

For example, the city of Guangzhou (seat of the eponymous prefecture, also known as Canton in the Western world) was historically divided by Nanhai County and Panyu County. When the first modern city government in China was established in Guangzhou, the urban area was separated from these two counties, with the rural areas left in the remaining parts of them. However, the county governments remained in the city for years, before moving into the respective counties. Similar processes happened in many Chinese cities.

Nowadays, most counties in mainland China, i.e. with "Xian" in their titles, are administered by prefecture-level cities and have mainly agricultural economies and rural populations.

Iran

The ostans (provinces) of Iran are further subdivided into counties called . County consists of a city centre, a few , and many villages around them. There are usually a few cities and rural agglomerations in each county. Rural agglomerations are a collection of a number of villages. One of the cities of the county is appointed as the capital of the county.

Iran had 324  in 2005 and 443 in 2021.

Korea

County is the common English translation for the character  ( or ) that denotes the current second level political division in South Korea. In North Korea, the county is one type of municipal-level division.

Europe

Denmark

Denmark was divided into counties from 1662 to 2006. On 1 January 2007 the counties were replaced by five Regions. At the same time, the number of municipalities was slashed to 98.

The counties were first introduced in 1662, replacing the 49 fiefs in Denmark–Norway with the same number of counties. This number does not include the subdivisions of the Duchy of Schleswig, which was only under partial Danish control. The number of counties in Denmark (excluding Norway) had dropped to around 20 by 1793. Following the reunification of South Jutland with Denmark in 1920, four counties replaced the Prussian . Aabenraa and Sønderborg County merged in 1932 and Skanderborg and Aarhus were separated in 1942. From 1942 to 1970, the number stayed at 22. The number was further decreased by the 1970 Danish municipal reform, leaving 14 counties plus two cities unconnected to the county structure; Copenhagen and Frederiksberg.

In 2003, Bornholm County merged with the local five municipalities, forming the Bornholm Regional Municipality. The remaining 13 counties were abolished on 1 January 2007 where they were replaced by five new regions. In the same reform, the number of municipalities was slashed from 270 to 98 and all municipalities now belong to a region.

France

A  was a territory ruled by a count in medieval France. In modern France, the rough equivalent of a county as used in many English-speaking countries is a department. Ninety-six departments are in metropolitan France, and five are overseas departments, which are also classified as overseas regions. Departments are further subdivided into 334 arrondissements, but these have no autonomy; they are the basis of local organisation of police, fire departments and, sometimes, administration of elections.

Germany

Each administrative district consists of an elected council and an executive, and whose duties are comparable to those of a county executive in the United States, supervising local government administration. Historically, counties in the Holy Roman Empire were called .
The majority of German districts are "rural districts", of which there are 294 . Cities with more than 100,000 inhabitants (and smaller towns in some states) do not usually belong to a district, but take on district responsibilities themselves, similar to the concept of independent cities and there are 107 of them, bringing the total number of districts to 401.

Hungary

The administrative unit of Hungary is called  (between 1950-2022 they were called , historically also  in Latin), which can be translated with the word county. The two names are used interchangeably ('megye' used in common parlance, and when referring to the counties of other states), just like before 1950, when the word 'megye' even appeared in legal texts. The 19 counties constitute the highest level of the administrative subdivisions of the country together with the capital city Budapest, although counties and the capital are grouped into seven statistical regions.

Counties are subdivided into districts and municipalities, the two types of which are towns (város) and villages (község), each one having their own elected mayor and council. 23 of the towns have the rights of a county although they do not form independent territorial units equal to counties.

The  was also the historic administrative unit in the Kingdom of Hungary, which included areas of present-day neighbouring countries of Hungary. Its Latin name is the equivalent of the French . Actual political and administrative role of counties changed much through history. Originally they were subdivisions of the royal administration, but from the 13th century they became self-governments of the nobles and kept this character until the 19th century when in turn they became modern local governments.

Ireland

The island of Ireland was historically divided into 32 counties, of which 26 later formed the Republic of Ireland and 6 made up Northern Ireland.

These counties are traditionally grouped into four provinces: Leinster (12 counties), Munster (6), Connacht (5) and Ulster (9). In the Republic each county is administered by an elected "county council", and the old provincial divisions are merely traditional names with no political significance.

The number and boundaries of administrative counties in the Republic of Ireland were reformed in the 1990s. For example, County Dublin was divided into three: Dún Laoghaire–Rathdown, Fingal, and South Dublin; the City of Dublin had existed for centuries before. The cities of Cork and Galway have been separated from the town and rural areas of their counties. The cities of Limerick and Waterford were merged with their respective counties in 2014. Thus, the Republic of Ireland now has 31 'county-level' authorities, although the borders of the original twenty-six counties are still officially in place.

In Northern Ireland, the six county councils and the smaller town councils were abolished in 1973 and replaced by a single tier of local government. However, in the north as well as in the south, the traditional 32 counties and 4 provinces remain in common usage for many sporting, cultural and other purposes. County identity is heavily reinforced in the local culture by allegiances to county teams in hurling and Gaelic football. Each Gaelic Athletic Association county has its own flag/colours (and often a nickname), and county allegiances are taken quite seriously. See the counties of Ireland and the Gaelic Athletic Association.

Italy
In Italy the word county is not used; the administrative sub-division of a region is called . Italian provinces are mainly named after their principal town and comprise several administrative subdivisions called  ('communes'). There are currently 110 provinces in Italy.

In the context of pre-modern Italy, the Italian word  generally refers to the countryside surrounding, and controlled by, the city state. The  provided natural resources and agricultural products to sustain the urban population. In contemporary usage,  can refer to a metropolitan area, and in some cases large rural/suburban regions providing resources to distant cities.

Lithuania

 (plural ) is the Lithuanian word for county. Since 1994 Lithuania has 10 counties; before 1950 it had 20. The only purpose with the county is an office of a state governor who shall conduct law and order in the county.

Norway

Norway has been divided into 11 counties since 2020; they previously numbered 19 following a local government reform in 1972. Until that year Bergen was a separate county, but today it is a municipality within the county of Vestland. One county, Oslo, is not divided into municipalities, rather it is equivalent to the municipality of Oslo.

Each county has its own county council whose representatives are elected every four years together with representatives to the municipal councils. The counties handle matters such as high schools and local roads, and until 1 January 2002 hospitals as well. This last responsibility was transferred to the state-run health authorities and health trusts, and there is a debate on the future of the county municipality as an administrative entity. Some people, and parties, such as the Conservative and Progress Party, call for the abolition of the county municipalities once and for all, while others, including the Labour Party, merely want to merge some of them into larger regions.

Poland

The territorial administration of Poland since 1999 has been based on three levels of subdivision. The country is divided into voivodeships (provinces); these are further divided into powiats (counties or districts). The term powiat is often translated into English as county (or sometimes district). In historical contexts this may be confusing because the Polish term hrabstwo (a territorial unit administered/owned by a hrabia (count) is also literally translated as "county" and it was subordinated under powiat.

The 380 county-level entities in Poland include 314 "land counties" (powiaty ziemskie) and the 66 "city counties" (miasta na prawach powiatu or powiaty grodzkie) . They are subdivisions of the 16 voivodeship, and are further subdivided into 2,477 gminas (also called commune or municipality).

Romania

The Romanian word for county, is not currently used for any Romanian administrative divisions. Romania is divided into a total of 41 counties, which along with the municipality of Bucharest, constitute the official administrative divisions of Romania. They represent the country's NUTS-3 (Nomenclature of Territorial Units for Statistics – Level 3) statistical subdivisions within the European Union and each of them serves as the local level of government within its borders. Most counties are named after a major river, while some are named after notable cities within them, such as the county seat.

Sweden

The Swedish division into counties, which literally means 'fief', was established in 1634, and was based on an earlier division into provinces; Sweden is divided into 21 counties and 290 municipalities (kommuner). At the county level there is a county administrative board led by a governor appointed by the central government of Sweden, as well as an elected county council that handles a separate set of issues, notably hospitals and public transportation for the municipalities within its borders.

Every county council corresponds to a county with a number of municipalities per county. County councils and municipalities have different roles and separate responsibilities relating to local government. Health care, public transport and certain cultural institutions are administered by county councils while general education, public water utilities, garbage disposal, elderly care and rescue services are administered by the municipalities. Gotland is a special case of being a county council with only one municipality and the functions of county council and municipality are performed by the same organisation.

Ukraine 
In Ukraine the county was introduced in Ukrainian territories under Poland in the second half of the 14th century, and in the eighteenth century under the Russian Empire in the Cossack Hetmanate, Sloboda Ukraine, Southern Ukraine, and Right-Bank Ukraine. In 1913 there were 126 counties in Ukrainian-inhabited territories of the Russian Empire. Under the Austrian Empire in 1914 there were 59 counties in Ukrainian-inhabited Galicia, 34 in Transcarpathia, and 10 in Bukovina. Counties were retained by the independent Ukrainian People's Republic of 1917–1921, and in Czechoslovakia, Poland, and Romania until the Soviet annexations at the start of World War II. 99 counties formed the Ukrainian SSR in 1919, where they were abolished in 1923–25 in favour of 53 okruhas (in turn replaced by oblasts in 1930–32), although they existed in the Zakarpattia Oblast until 1953.

United Kingdom

The United Kingdom is divided into a number of metropolitan and non-metropolitan counties. There are also ceremonial counties which group small non-metropolitan counties into geographical areas broadly based on the historic counties of England. In 1974, the metropolitan and non-metropolitan counties replaced the system of administrative counties and county boroughs which was introduced in 1889. The counties generally belong to level 3 of the Nomenclature of Territorial Units for Statistics (NUTS 3).

In 1965 and 1974–1975, major reorganisations of local government in England and Wales created several new administrative counties such as Hereford and Worcester (abolished again in 1998 and reverted, with some transfers of territory, to the two separate historic counties of Herefordshire and Worcestershire) and also created several new metropolitan counties based on large urban areas as a single administrative unit. In Scotland, county-level local government was replaced by larger regions, which lasted until 1996. Modern local government in Scotland, Wales, Northern Ireland and a large part of England is trending towards smaller unitary authorities: a system similar to that proposed in the 1960s by the Redcliffe-Maud Report for most of Britain.

The name "county" was introduced by the Normans, and was derived from a Norman term for an area administered by a Count (lord). These Norman "counties" were simply the Saxon shires, and kept their Saxon names. Several traditional counties, including Essex, Sussex and Kent, predate the unification of England by Alfred the Great, and were originally more or less independent kingdoms (although the most important Saxon Kingdom on the island of Britain, Alfred's own Wessex, no longer survives in any form).

England

In England, in the Anglo-Saxon period, shires were established as areas used for the raising of taxes, and usually had a fortified town at their centre. This became known as the shire town or later the county town. In many cases, the shires were named after their shire town (for example Bedfordshire), but there are several exceptions, such as Cumberland, Norfolk and Suffolk. In several other cases, such as Buckinghamshire, the modern county town is different from the town after which the shire is named. (See Toponymical list of counties of the United Kingdom)

Most non-metropolitan counties in England are run by county councils and are divided into non-metropolitan districts, each with its own council. Local authorities in the UK are usually responsible for education, emergency services, planning, transport, social services, and a number of other functions.

Until 1974, the county boundaries of England changed little over time. In the medieval period, a number of important cities were granted the status of counties in their own right, such as London, Bristol and Coventry, and numerous small exclaves such as Islandshire were created. In 1844, most of these exclaves were transferred to their surrounding counties.

Northern Ireland

In Northern Ireland, the six county councils, if not their counties, were abolished in 1973 and replaced by 26 local government districts. The traditional six counties remain in common everyday use for many cultural and other purposes.

Scotland and Wales

The thirteen historic counties of Wales were fixed by statute in 1539 (although counties such as Pembrokeshire date from 1138) and most of the shires of Scotland are of at least this age. The Welsh word for county is sir which is derived from the English 'shire'. The word is officially used to signify counties in Wales. In the Gaelic form, Scottish traditional county names are generally distinguished by the designation —literally "sheriffdom", e.g.  (Argyllshire). This term corresponds to the jurisdiction of the sheriff in the Scottish legal system.

North America

Canada

In Ontario, Quebec and Nova Scotia, provinces that have a two-tier system of local government, the counties constitute the upper tier and local municipalities form the lower tier.

Manitoba and Saskatchewan are divided into rural municipalities. The Northwest Territories and Nunavut are divided into regions; however, these regions only serve to streamline the delivery of territorial governmental services, and have no government of their own. Newfoundland and Labrador, and Yukon do not have any second-level administrative subdivision between the provincial/territorial government and their municipalities.

New Brunswick and Prince Edward Island
The counties of New Brunswick and Prince Edward Island are historical and have no governments of their own today. However, they remain used as census divisions by Statistics Canada, and by locals as geographic identifiers.

Ontario
The primary administrative division of Southern Ontario is its 22 counties, which are upper-tier local governments providing limited municipal services to rural and moderately dense areas—within them, there are a variety of lower-tier towns, cities, villages, etc. that provide most municipal services. This contrasts with Northern Ontario's 10 districts, which are geographic divisions but not local governments—although some towns, etc. are within them that are local governments, the low population densities and much larger area have significant impacts on how government is organized and operates. In both Northern and Southern Ontario, urban densities in cities are one of two other local structures: regional municipalities (restructured former counties which are also upper tiers) or single-tier municipalities.

Quebec
Quebec's counties are more properly called "Regional County Municipalities". The province's former counties proper were supplanted in the early 1980s.

Alberta
A county in Alberta used to be a type of designation in a single-tier municipal system; but this was nominally changed to "municipal district" under the Municipal Government Act, when the County Act was repealed in the mid-1990s. However, at the time the new "municipal districts" were also permitted to retain the usage of county in their official names.

As a result, in Alberta, the term county is synonymous with the term municipal district – it is not its own incorporated municipal status that is different from that of a municipal district.  As such, Alberta Municipal Affairs provides municipal districts with the opportunity to change to a county in their official names, but some have chosen to hold out with the municipal district title. The vast majority of "municipal districts" in Alberta are named as counties.

British Columbia
British Columbia has counties for the purposes of its justice system but otherwise they hold no governmental function. For the provision of all other governmental services, the province is divided into regional districts that form the upper tier, which are further subdivided into local municipalities that are partly autonomous, and unincorporated electoral areas that are governed directly by the regional districts.

Manitoba
The province of Manitoba was divided into counties; however, these counties were abolished in 1890.

Jamaica
Jamaica is divided into 14 parishes which are grouped together into 3 historic counties: Cornwall, Middlesex, and Surrey.

United States

Counties in U.S. states are administrative or political subdivision of the state in which their boundaries are drawn. In addition, the United States Census Bureau uses the term "county equivalent" to describe places that are comparable to counties, but called by different names. Today, 3,142 counties and county equivalents carve up the United States, ranging in number from 3 for Delaware to 254 for Texas.

Forty-eight of the 50 U.S. states use the term "county", while Alaska and Louisiana use the terms "borough" and "parish", respectively, for analogous jurisdictions. A consolidated city-county such as Philadelphia and San Francisco is formed when a city and county merge into one unified jurisdiction. Conversely, an independent city like Baltimore, St. Louis, and all cities in Virginia legally belongs to no county, i.e. no county even nominally exists in those places compared to a consolidated city-county where a county does legally exist in some form. The District of Columbia, outside the jurisdiction of any state, is viewed by the U.S. Census Bureau as a single county equivalent.

The specific governmental powers of counties vary widely between the states. They are generally the intermediate tier of state government, between the statewide tier and the immediately local government tier (typically a city, town/borough or village/township). Some of the governmental functions that a county may offer include judiciary, county prisons, land registration, enforcement of building codes, and federally mandated services programs. Depending on the individual state, counties or their equivalents may be administratively subdivided into townships, boroughs or boros, or towns (in the New England states, New York and Wisconsin). For independent cities and consolidated city-counties, those places report directly to the state.

New York City is a special case where the city is made up of five boroughs, each of which is territorially coterminous with a county of New York State. In the context of city government, the boroughs are subdivisions of the city but are still called "county" where state function is involved, e.g., "New York County Courthouse".

County governments in Rhode Island and Connecticut have been completely abolished but the entities remain for administrative and statistical purposes. Alaska's  Unorganized Borough also has no county equivalent government, but the U.S. Census Bureau further divides it into statistical county equivalent subdivisions called census areas.

The areas of each county also vary widely between the states. For example, the territorially medium-sized state of Pennsylvania has 67 counties delineated in geographically convenient ways. By way of contrast, Massachusetts, with far less territory, has massively sized counties in comparison even to Pennsylvania's largest, yet each organizes their judicial and incarceration officials similarly.

Most counties have a county seat: a city, town, or other named place where its administrative functions are centered. Some New England states use the term shire town to mean "county seat". A handful of counties like Harrison County, Mississippi have two or more county seats, usually located on opposite sides of the county, dating back from the days when travel was difficult.  In Virginia, where all cities are independent, some double as county seats despite not being part of a county.  Notable examples include the independent City of Fairfax serving as the seat of Fairfax County and Salem serving as the county seat of Roanoke County.

Oceania

Australia
In the eastern states of Australia, counties are used in the administration of land titles. They do not generally correspond to a level of government, but are used in the identification of parcels of land.

The local communities in Australia that share the same post code are usually referred to as suburbs or localities. Several neighboring suburbs are often serviced by the same local government known as a council, whose jurisdiction is officially known as the local government area (LGA). An LGA functions basically the same way as a county of other countries, although it is called instead as "city", "municipality", "shire", "borough", "town", "district" or simple "councils" depending on the state/territory and subregion. It performs municipal services and regulates permits for land uses, but lacks any legislative or law enforcement powers.

New Zealand

After New Zealand abolished its provinces in 1876, a system of counties similar to other countries' systems was instituted, lasting until 1989. They had chairmen, not mayors as boroughs and cities had; many legislative provisions (such as burial and land subdivision control) were different for the counties.

During the second half of the 20th century, many counties received overflow population from nearby cities. The result was often a merger of the two into a district (e.g. Rotorua) or a change of name to either district (e.g. Waimairi) or city (e.g. Manukau City).

The Local Government Act 1974 began the process of bringing urban, mixed, and rural councils into the same legislative framework. Substantial reorganisations under that Act resulted in the 1989 shake-up, which covered the country in (non-overlapping) cities and districts and abolished all the counties except for the Chatham Islands County, which survived under that name for a further 6 years but then became a "Territory" under the "Chatham Islands Council".

South America

Argentina
Provinces in Argentina are divided into departments, except in the Buenos Aires Province, where they are called . The Autonomous City of Buenos Aires is divided into communes.

Brazil
States in Brazil were divided into microregions before they were replaced by "immediate geographic regions" in 2017.

Notes

References

External links

 

 
Types of administrative division